Pteraspis (from   'wing' or 'fin' and   'shield') is an extinct genus of pteraspidid heterostracan agnathan vertebrate that lived from the Lochkovian to Eifelian epochs of the Devonian period in what is now Brazil (Eifelian Maecuru Formation), Britain (Lochkovian Ditton Group), Ukraine (Lochkovian Ivane Suite, Pragian Babin Sandstone) and Belgium.

Description 

Like other heterostracan fishes, Pteraspis had a protective armored plating covering the front of its body. Though lacking fins other than its lobed tail, it is thought to have been a good swimmer thanks to stiff, wing-like protrusions derived from the armoured plates over its gills. This, along with the horn-like rostrum, made Pteraspis very streamlined in shape; a perfect quality for a good swimmer. Pteraspis also had some stiff spikes on its back, possibly an additional form of protection against predators. It is thought to have fed from shoals of plankton just under the ocean surface, and is found in association with marine fossils.

References 

Pteraspidiformes genera
Devonian jawless fish
Early Devonian fish
Early Devonian genus first appearances
Lochkovian life
Pragian life
Emsian life
Eifelian life
Middle Devonian genus extinctions
Early Devonian fish of Europe
Devonian England
Fossils of England
Paleozoic Ukraine
Fossils of Ukraine
Devonian animals of South America
Devonian Brazil
Fossils of Brazil
Fossil taxa described in 1835
Fossil taxa described in 1847
Taxa named by Louis Agassiz